Michael Mellett (born 1945) is an Irish former Gaelic footballer who played for club side Martinstown and at inter-county level with the Meath senior football team. He usually lined out as a left wing-forward.

Career

Mellett first came to sporting prominence as a schoolboy with Trim CBS. At club level, he lined out with Martinstown and won a Meath JFC in 1969 and a Meath IFC as part of a Martinstown-Athboy selection in 1979. Mellett first appeared on the inter-county scene as a dual player at minor level in 1963. He was selected for the Meath junior football team in 1966, while also lining out in both codes in the under-21 grade. Mellett was promoted to the senior team for a challenge game against Leitrim and was a member of the extended panel for the 1966 All-Ireland final defeat by Galway. He made the starting fifteen the following year and was at left wing-forward for the defeat of Cork in the 1967 All-Ireland final. Mellett's other honours include three Leinster Championship medals.

Personal life

Mellett was born Mícheál Ó Méalóid in Connemara, County Galway. He moved to Ráth Chairn in the Meath Gaeltacht as a 10-year-old boy before settling in Dublin in 1973.

Honours

Martinstown
Meath Intermediate Football Championship: 1979
Meath Junior Football Championship: 1969

Meath
All-Ireland Senior Football Championship: 1967
Leinster Senior Football Championship: 1964, 1966, 1967, 1970

References

1945 births
Living people
Meath inter-county Gaelic footballers
Winners of one All-Ireland medal (Gaelic football)
Dual players